Fousseni Diabaté (born 18 October 1995) is a professional footballer who plays as an attacking midfielder or forward for Serbian club Partizan. Born in France, Diabaté has played international football for Mali.

Club career
Diabaté was born in Aubervilliers, Seine-Saint-Denis. He was at the youth academy at Stade Rennais for seven years before being kicked out, and thereafter joined Stade de Reims. He played for the reserves of En Avant de Guingamp before joining Gazélec Ajaccio on 20 June 2017. He made his professional debut with Gazélec Ajaccio in a 1–1 Ligue 2 tie with Valenciennes FC on 28 July 2017, assisting his side's only goal.

On 13 January 2018, Diabaté moved to Leicester City for an undisclosed fee. Two weeks later, he made his debut for Leicester City in the FA Cup fourth round match against Peterborough United and scored twice in a 5–1 win.

He joined Sivasspor on loan in January 2019.

On 25 September 2020, Diabaté joined Trabzonspor on a permanent deal.

On 7 July 2022, it was announced that Fousseni Diabaté signed a three year contract with Serbian club Partizan being handed the #18 shirt. Diabaté made his debut on 23 July against TSC Bačka Topola in a 0–0 draw he came into the game in 57th minute as a sub for Nikola Terzić. On 11 August, Diabaté made his second appearance in the UEFA Europa League third qualifying round, a 2–2 home draw against AEK Larnaca. He provided two assists for Ricardo Gomes Fousseni scored first goal in a 4–1 win over Ħamrun Spartans at the play-off round of UEFA Europa Conference League.

Partizan was placed in Group D with Nice, Köln and Slovácko.  Diabaté played in all six games and scored four goals. Fousseni Diabaté scored his debut goal in the SuperLiga on the road against Napredak. Diabaté made a sudden attempt, the ball caught Dejan Kerkez on the way to the goal and outwitted the helpless Nikola Petrić.

International career
Diabaté made one appearance for the Mali U20s at the 2015 FIFA U-20 World Cup in a 2–0 loss to the Serbia U20s, as well as 5 games at the 2015 African U-20 Championship. He also appeared for the Mali U23s at the 2016 Toulon Tournament.

Career statistics

References

External links

FIFA Profile

Living people
1995 births
Sportspeople from Aubervilliers
French footballers
Citizens of Mali through descent
Malian footballers
Mali under-20 international footballers
Association football midfielders
Association football forwards
Association football utility players
Gazélec Ajaccio players
Leicester City F.C. players
Sivasspor footballers
Amiens SC players
Trabzonspor footballers
Göztepe S.K. footballers
Giresunspor footballers
FK Partizan players
Championnat National 3 players
Ligue 2 players
Premier League players
Süper Lig players
Serbian SuperLiga players
French expatriate footballers
Malian expatriate footballers
French expatriate sportspeople in England
Malian expatriate sportspeople in England
Expatriate footballers in England
French expatriate sportspeople in Turkey
Malian expatriate sportspeople in Turkey
Expatriate footballers in Turkey
French expatriate sportspeople in Serbia
Expatriate footballers in Serbia
French sportspeople of Malian descent
Footballers from Seine-Saint-Denis